The Academy of Fine Arts Sarajevo (acronym: ALU) is a faculty within the University of Sarajevo in Sarajevo, Bosnia and Herzegovina, dedicated to the fine arts.

It was established in 1972 as an institution of higher education by eminent professors, scientists, and acclaimed artists who were educated primarily in Belgrade, Ljubljana, and Zagreb.

History 
The then-newly established Academy of Fine Arts Sarajevo was first located in the building of the Pedagogical Academy in Sarajevo. At the same time, the home of today's ALU was the first and only evangelist church constructed in the times of the Austro-Hungarian occupation of BiH.

The church was built in 1899 and designed by the architect Karlo Paržik in a Romanesque-Byzantine style. The building was devastated in early 1992 at the start of the Bosnian War. The church was proclaimed a cultural-historical monument and is therefore included on the list of protected buildings by the Institute for the Protection of Cultural-Historical and Natural Heritage.

Muhamed Karamehmedović (an art historian and the first dean of ALU), Nada Pivac (an academic painter), Mersad Berber (an academic painter), Boro Aleksić (another academic painter), Alija Kučukalić (an academic sculptor), and Zdenko Grgić (another academic sculptor) are some of the famous professors and founders of the Academy of Fine Arts Sarajevo.

, the academy has had 2,666 enrolled students since its establishment; by May 2012, it had recorded 1,212 graduates for undergraduate study. Postgraduate studies were introduced in 1983. There are 237 Masters students (M. A. degree).

The academy houses six departments that offer a multitude of courses:
 Department of Art Education
 Department of Painting
 Department of Sculpting
 Department of Printmaking
 Department of Graphic Design
 Department of Product Design

The Academy of Fine Arts Sarajevo introduced the Bologna educational system (4+1) in the 2006/07 school year.

In front of the building itself, there is a pedestrian bridge that connects Radić Street with the academy. The bridge on the Miljacka river bears the phrase "Festina lente" (meaning "make haste slowly" in Latin). The 38 meter structure cost about 2 million KM, and was based on conceptual ideas and preliminary design by then students in their second year of Product Design at ALU: Amila Hrustić, Adnan Alagić and Bojan Kanlić.

Gallery

See also 
 Damir Nikšić (Painting Department 2000 graduate)
 Gabrijel Jurkić (graduate)
 Šejla Kamerić (Graphic Department graduate)

References

Further reading

External links

Academy of Fine Arts
Academy of Fine Arts
Educational institutions established in 1972
1972 establishments in Bosnia and Herzegovina